HMS Vengeur was a 74-gun third rate  of the Royal Navy, launched on 19 June 1810 at Harwich. She had an uneventful career, having participated in no battles or engagements.

Service
On 30 August 1810, Captain Thomas Brown took command of Vengeur, the flagship of Admiral Sir Joseph Sidney Yorke. Brown escorted to Portugal a large body of troops sent as reinforcements to the Duke of Wellington's army there. Vengeur then cruised the Western Isles to protect an inbound fleet of East Indiamen.

Brown's replacement in November 1811 was Captain James Brisbane. Robert Tristram Ricketts took command of Vengeur in October 1813.

In May 1814 the 9th Regiment of Foot marched from Bayonne to Bordeaux and embarked on York and Vengeur to sail to Quebec to lend support to the British Army in the fight against the Americans during the War of 1812.

Vengeur then joined Vice Admiral Alexander Cochrane's fleet moored off New Orleans on New Year's Day, having escorted troopships carrying the battalions of the 7th Regiment of Foot and 43rd Regiment of Foot. The Commanding Officer of the Vengeur'''s Marine detachment, Brevet Major Thomas Adair, was made a Companion of the Order of the Bath for leading a party of 100 Royal Marines on a successful assault of the left bank of the Mississippi River. Although the strongpoint was taken, and seventeen cannon were captured, the battle was lost as the right bank remained impregnable. Of the two fatalities among the Royal Marines, one was from HMS Vengeur.

Ricketts commanded the British naval forces at the Second Battle of Fort Bowyer, the British attack on the American fort at Mobile Point in 1815.  The British then attacked and captured Fort Bowyer at the mouth of Mobile Bay on 12 February. The British were making preparations to attack Mobile when news arrived of the peace treaty. The Treaty of Ghent had been ratified by the British Parliament but would not be ratified by Congress and the President until mid-February.

Captain Thomas Alexander took command in August 1815. Vengeur served as a guardship at Portsmouth from June 1816 to May 1818. From October to December she was fitted out for sea.

Frederick Lewis Maitland took command of Vengeur in October 1818, and in 1819 sailed her to South America.  He took Lord George Beresford from Rio de Janeiro to Lisbon in 1820, and then returned to the Mediterranean. He then carried Ferdinand I, King of the Two Sicilies from Naples to Livorno, on his way to attend the Congress of Laibach (modern Ljubljana). The passage was rough and lasted seven days, but they arrived safely on 20 December. After His Majesty landed, he personally invested Maitland with the insignia of a knight-commander of the order of St. Ferdinand and of Merit, and gave him a gold box with the king's portrait set in diamonds. Maitland and Vengeur then returned to England, arriving at Spithead on 29 March 1821. Vengeur was found to be defective and was paid off on 18 May 1821 at Sheerness.

Fate
She was fitted as a receiving ship between July 1823 and February 1824. She then went to Shearness where she served as a receiving ship until 1838. She was broken up in 1843.

Notes

Citations

References

 Anderson, William (1862) The Scottish nation: or The surnames, families, literature, honours, and biographical history of the people of Scotland.(Google eBook)
 Lavery, Brian (2003) The Ship of the Line - Volume 1: The development of the battlefleet 1650-1850.'' Conway Maritime Press. .

  

Ships of the line of the Royal Navy
Vengeur-class ships of the line
1810 ships
Ships built in Harwich
War of 1812 ships of the United Kingdom